Armament Systems and Procedures, Inc. (ASP, Inc.) is a US defensive compliance weapons manufacturer providing equipment to law enforcement and private security companies. ASP telescoping batons are widely used.

History 
 1976—company founded. Agencies such as the US Secret Service use ASP batons as an intermediate non-lethal weapon.
 1987—launched the ASP training division with the inaugural Tactical Baton Seminar, held in Atlantic City
 1995—entered the pepper spray business with the introduction of the Defender.
 1996—entered the police flashlight business. 
 2004—designed and engineered restraints. 
 2019—The Armament Systems and Procedures' Transport Kit wins 2019 Public Safety Product Innovation Award.

Customers
 Federal Bureau of Investigation
 Chicago Police Department
 Virginia State Police
 Portland Police
 Butler Township
 Salina Police Force
 Vancouver Police Department
 Edmonton Police Department
 Garda Síochána
Metropolitan Police Service
 Salt Lake City Police Department
Seattle Police

ASP telescopic baton

ASP manufactures telescoping batons.  An assessment by law enforcement officers found them preferred to the usual straight baton for their portability, convenience, effectiveness, usability, and psychological impact.

Since the early 1990s, ASP batons have been adopted by law enforcement agencies in the United States, United Kingdom, Canada, New Zealand and Australia. Expandable batons in general are sometimes referred to as "Asps".

They are available with several variations, such as color (black being the most common, but some have nickel-plated shafts), grip pattern and material, and metal composition, the most common being 4140 high carbon steel, with an "airweight" line using a light-weight alloy with a combination of steel and aluminum.

ASP batons are friction-lock in design, and are opened by swinging the handle forcibly through the air.  To close this type, the baton's tip is driven into a hard surface to break the friction.  A version introduced in 2010 but since discontinued is called "LeverLoc", opened the same way was as friction-lock, but closable by twisting the shafts with both hands, and slightly longer when collapsed state due to the mechanism; a LeverLoc designed for plainclothes concealment was also produced. The friction-lock Airweight series (P12 and P16), for plainclothed concealment, was released in 2012.

Other products

The company produces restraints such as handcuffs and plastic ties, 19 different types of flashlights, and other weapons accessories, including customization options.

References

Companies based in Wisconsin
Manufacturing companies established in 1976
Weapons manufacturing companies
1976 establishments in Wisconsin